Anthony "Tony" Bono is a retired American soccer player who played professionally in the Major Indoor Soccer League, American Indoor Soccer Association, National Professional Soccer League and Lone Star Soccer Alliance.

Bono graduated from Frankford High School, where he was a 1979 First-Team and 1980 Second-Team All-State soccer player.  Bono then attended Drexel University, where he was a 1984 first-team All-American soccer player.  In 1985, the Minnesota Strikers of the Major Indoor Soccer League drafted Bono in the third round.  In December 1987, the Strikers waived Bono.  On January 15, 1988, the Chicago Sting signed Bono to a ten-day contract.  The Sting kept Bono on the roster until they folded at the end of the season.  Bono then spent the summer season with the Houston Dynamos of the Lone Star Soccer Alliance. The Dynamos went to the championship game where they fell to Dallas Mean Green. In the fall of 1988, Bono signed with the Hershey Impact of the American Indoor Soccer Association but was traded to the Dayton Dynamo on November 2, 1988, for a second-round draft pick and cash.  He remained with the Dynamo until 1996.  In January 1995, Bono became head coach of the Dynamo.  The team ownership made this decision because Bono had acted as head coach at the end of the 1991–1992 season and had suffered a season-ending knee injury earlier in the 1994–1995 season.  During the 1995 off-season, the Dynamos moved to Cincinnati, Ohio to become the Cincinnati Silverbacks.  On November 17, 1995, the Silverbacks traded Bono to the Chicago Power.  On March 6, 1996, the Power sent Bono to the Milwaukee Wave.  In June 1996, Bono moved to the Philadelphia Kixx.

In 2001, he was inducted into the Southeastern Pennsylvania Soccer Hall of Fame.

References

External links
 MISL stats

1963 births
Living people
Soccer players from Philadelphia
All-American men's college soccer players
American Indoor Soccer Association players
American soccer players
Chicago Power players
Chicago Sting (MISL) players
Cincinnati Silverbacks players
Dayton Dynamo players
Drexel Dragons men's soccer players
Houston Dynamos players
Lone Star Soccer Alliance players
Major Indoor Soccer League (1978–1992) players
Milwaukee Wave players
Minnesota Strikers (MISL) players
National Professional Soccer League (1984–2001) coaches
National Professional Soccer League (1984–2001) players
Philadelphia KiXX players
Player-coaches
Association football midfielders
Association football defenders
American soccer coaches